Season thirty of the television program American Experience aired on the PBS network in the United States on January 9, 2018 and concluded on October 16, 2018. The season contained nine new episodes, including the retitled episode "The Island Murder", a rebroadcast of the 2005 film, "The Massie Affair". The episode "The Chinese Exclusion Act" aired as a "special presentation" of the American Experience program. The season began with the film Into the Amazon.

Episodes

References

2018 American television seasons
American Experience